Congo Tales is a photo series book of Congolese from the Mbomo District acting out their mythologies in the Odzala Kokoua National Park. It was published by Prestel Publishing (a division of Random House) in the United States on November 15, 2018, and in the UK on July 9, 2018.

The book was photographed by Pieter Henket, and it was edited by Eva Vonk and Stefanie Plattner of Tales of Us in Berlin. The Congolese mythology in the book was adapted by Congolese philosopher S. R. Kovo N'Sondé and author Wilfried N'Sondé. Congo Tales is the first in a series of productions by Tales of Us.
The project includes a short film directed by Stefanie Plattner based on one of the Congolese myths in the book called The Little Fish and the Crocodile. The third project from Tales of Us is 
Tales@Home, a free online education program that introduces children to ecological wonderlands -- and the culture of the people who live there -- from around the globe. The first installment -- Akesi and the Congo River -- is based on Congo Tales.

Tales of Us 
Tales Of Us is an ongoing multimedia series that offers a new approach to communicating the urgency of protecting the world's most powerful and fragile ecosystems and the people who call them home. Congo Tales and The Little Fish and the Crocodile are its first such projects.

The Little Fish and the Crocodile 
The project includes a short film based on one of the Congolese myths in the book called The Little Fish and the Crocodile. The film was directed by Stefanie Plattner and produced by Eva Vonk. It won at several major film festivals, including Best Live Action Short at the 35th Chicago International Children's Film Festival.

Tales@Home 
Tales of Us''' follow up project is Tales@Home, a free online education program that introduces children to ecological wonderlands -- and the culture of the people who live there -- from around the globe. The first installment -- Akesi and the Congo River -- is based on Congo Tales.

 References 

Further reading
Interview with Eva Vonk, Pieter Henket and S.R. Kovo N'Sondé on PBS NewsHourInterview with Eva Vonk, Pieter Henket and S.R. Kovo N'Sondé on National Public Radio
Interview with Eva Vonk and S.R. Kovo N'Sondé on Public Radio International, The World
Interview with Eva Vonk on Monocle 24 Radio
Review of Congo Tales on My Modern Met
Photo spread of Congo Tales in El Pais'' newspaper, Spain
Interview with Eva Vonk and Pieter Henket in Aesthetica Magazine

Exhibitions
2019, exhibition, Congo Tales, Museum de Fundatie, Zwolle, Netherlands
2018, exhibition, Congo Tales, Museum Barberini, Potsdam, Germany

External links
Tales of Us website
Tales@Home website
Storming Donkey Productions

2018 non-fiction books
Prestel Publishing books